Naturbål ("Nature's Bonfire") is the ninth full-length album by Swedish folk metal band Vintersorg. As with the previous three albums, the lyrics are all in Swedish.  This is the third of a planned four-album concept series based on the elements, the previous two being Jordpuls and Orkan.

Track listing

Personnel

Vintersorg
Andreas Hedlund  - vocals, guitars (acoustic, lead, rhythm), bass, keyboards, programming 
Mattias Marklund - guitars (lead, rhythm)

Guest musicians and staff
Simon Lundström - bass
Helena Sofia Lidman - female vocals on "Ur aska och sot"
Frida Eurenius - female vocals on "Rymdens brinnande öar"
Kris Verwimp - cover art, artwork
Örjan Fredriksson - photography
 Produced, engineered, mastered and mixed by Vintersorg

References

Vintersorg albums
2014 albums
Napalm Records albums